Scythris catuliformis is a moth of the family Scythrididae. It was described by Bengt Å. Bengtsson in 2014. It is found in Malawi.

References

catuliformis
Moths described in 2014